Yoraperla mariana, the brown roachfly, is a species of roach-like stonefly in the family Peltoperlidae. It is found in North America.

References

Plecoptera
Articles created by Qbugbot
Insects described in 1943